La Femme Desperado (Traditional Chinese: 女人唔易做) is a TVB modern drama series broadcast in April 2006.  The series contains many realistic elements relating to the life of a woman in today's modern society, particularly in Hong Kong. It was considered to be a favourite among audiences, ranking number 1 in audience ratings for TVB series that year. It was widely praised by critics and audiences for its acting, writing and character development. It won the TVB Anniversary Award for Best Drama Series in 2006.

Synopsis
There are three pairs of couples and their roles highlight the roles of women in modern society:

Chai Foon (Raymond Lam) and Ko Chi-Ling (Melissa Ng) - Chai Foon has been in love with his tutor, Ling, since he was 11 and she was 18. They depict the problems of overcoming a seven-year age gap in traditional Chinese society.
Man King-Leung (Michael Tse) and Hilda Hoi Kiu (Sheren Tang) - shows their quest to power and fame, their readiness to sacrifice anything - even their loved ones - for the sake of climbing the corporate ladder. However, throughout the show, their characters began to make the realization that love and family are actually much more significant in life than success in the business world.
Ko Chi-Lik (Kenneth Ma) and Ida Hoi Suen (Kate Tsui) - focuses on the status of women in modern society. Raised in a patriarchal environment, Lik, who has very old-fashioned thinking, believes that women cannot become sushi chefs. He believes that women should be staying at home, cooking, serving their husbands and caring for their children. Ida on the other hand, is a very strong-willed modern Chinese woman. Through her determination, confidence and persistence, she proves her skills to him. Their frequent conflict and arguments over the rights and roles of women and Lik's eventual realization that women can indeed accomplish greater accomplishments than men show the gradual progression of value changes.

Alternate Ending 
For the first time in TVB drama history, an alternate ending was created for the series. An interview special, hosted by Carol Cheng, was aired after the finale which featured Melissa Ng, Sheren Tang, Kate Tsui, and Michael Tse. During the special, a three-minute alternate ending was shown to audiences featuring the final two scenes but unlike the original ending that is more open ended, Hilda makes it clear to Man that he is the biological father of their child and Ling tells Hilda that she will marry Chai Foon again but this time, it is her own choice and for herself.

Cast

Main cast

Other cast

Characters
Ko Chi-Ling (Melissa Ng), nicknamed "Ko Ling", is a 32-year-old assistant manager of Pluto, a consumer product distributor. Ling comes from a very traditional family, who expected women to marry and give birth to children as soon as possible, and avoid a professional career. After finding out that her husband and co-worker Man King Leung had an affair, she divorced him, and began to learn from Hilda as she makes her way up in the corporate world.
Hilda Hoi Kiu (Sheren Tang) is a 37-year-old product manager of Pluto. She is considered to be the definition of a strong businesswoman. Hilda would use all her charm to get business, often alienating many coworkers in the process. Her characteristics of a strong businesswoman is "forced-out" due to the huge disappointment towards men when her ex-boyfriend whom she loved accused her for the sake of climbing up the corporate ladder plus the fact her father abandon their family for another woman further deepen it. However, the otherside of her is very gentle and feminine, towards her sister Hoi Suen.
Ida Hoi Suen (Kate Tsui) is the sister of Hilda. Hilda's and Ida relationship was very close in the earlier days, however was strained due to the over-concern by Hilda which back-fired. She fell in love with her sushi mentor.
Man King-Leung (Michael Tse) is a 38-year-old worker at Pluto. He is known to climb up the corporate greasy pole at all costs, earning him the title "Scum Man". after his divorce with Ko Ling, he had a relationship with Hilda. Man left Pluto to become an executive at Please, a department store chain, out of spite.
Chai Foon (Raymond Lam) is married to Ko Chi-Ling, despite a 7-year age difference between them. He acts on an impulse, and this led to strains in their marriage.
Ko Chi-Lik (Kenneth Ma) is the younger brother of Ling. He is a sushi chef by profession, and fell in love with his student, Ida Hoi. His father's chauvinistic attitudes rubbed off on him, and this caused much strain in their relationship.

Viewership ratings

Awards and nominations

Awards
39th TVB Anniversary Awards (2006)
 "Best Drama"
 "Most Improved Actor" (Kenneth Ma)

Ming Pao (2006) Television Awards
 "Best Drama Series"

Nominations
39th TVB Anniversary Awards (2006)
 Nominated - "Best Actor in a Leading Role" (Raymond Lam - Chai Foon) Top 5
 Nominated - "Best Actor in a Leading Role" (Michael Tse - Man King-Leung) 
 Nominated - "Best Actress in a Leading Role" (Sheren Tang - Hilda Hoi Kiu) Top 5
 Nominated - "Best Actor in a Supporting Role" (Kenneth Ma - Ko Chi-Lik) 
 Nominated - "Best Actor in a Supporting Role" (Li Ka Sing - Ko Chi-Lun) 
 Nominated - "Best Actor in a Supporting Role" (Bryan Leung - Ko Wing-Tim) 
 Nominated - "Best Actress in a Supporting Role" (Kate Tsui - Ida Hoi Suen) 
 Nominated - "Best Actress in a Supporting Role" (Cindy Au - Kong Ching-Ching) 
 Nominated - "My Favourite Male Character Role" (Raymond Lam - Chai Foon) Top 5
 Nominated - "My Favourite Male Character Role" (Michael Tse - Man King-Leung) 
 Nominated - "My Favourite Female Character Role" (Sheren Tang - Hilda Hoi Kiu) Top 5
 Nominated - "My Favourite Female Character Role" (Kate Tsui - Ida Hoi Suen) 
 Nominated - "My Favourite Female Character Role" (Melissa Ng - Ko Chi-Ling) 
 Nominated - "Most Improved Actor" (Michael Tse)

References

External links
TVB.com La Femme Desperado - Official Website 
SPCNET.tv La Femme Desperado - Review 

TVB dramas
2006 Hong Kong television series debuts
2006 Hong Kong television series endings